Pirate TV is a 2012 French comedy film directed by Michel Leclerc.

Plot 
Life of a local independent TV in the 1990s in France run by Jean Lou, Yasmina, Stephen and Adonis, anarchists and provocateurs of the first hour, ready to make revolution.

Cast 

 Félix Moati as Victor
 Éric Elmosnino as Jean-Lou
 Sara Forestier as Clara
 Maïwenn as Yasmina
 Emmanuelle Béart as Patricia Gabriel
 Yannick Choirat as Étienne
 Zinedine Soualem as Jimmy
 Samir Guesmi as Bébé
 François-Éric Gendron as Victor's father
 Christiane Millet as Victor's mother
 Lionel Girard as Adonis
 Anne Benoît as Madame Serrano
 Carla Besnaïnou as Justine
 Aristide Demonico as Poliakov
 Flora Tonnelier as Flora
 Franc Bruneau as Juan
 Laurent Firode as A protester

Accolades

References

External links 

2012 films
2012 comedy films
French comedy films
Films directed by Michel Leclerc
2010s French-language films
2010s French films